The Suzuki GSX-S750 is a standard motorcycle made by Suzuki since 2015. The , 16-valve, inline-four, sports-bike-derived engine was modified and re-tuned for more usable torque at lower RPM for commuting and cruising at slower speeds.

The GSX-S750's predecessor, the GSR750, was sold in the European markets  since 2011, while Suzuki sold the same motor bike with a different body model in the USA under the GSX-S750 name in 2015 and 2016.

Comparing the GSX-S750 with the GSR750, the changes made to GSX-S750 include a new exhaust to comply with Euro 4 and California emission standards, a new tapered handlebar, new swing-arm, a revised air box, and ventilation holes in the bottom of each cylinder to reduce pumping loss and improve power. It uses a 43 tooth rear sprocket compared to the GSR's 42, to improve acceleration, and top gear was lengthened to keep the top speed the same (250 km/h +/- or 155 mph +/-).

It will be illegal to register the model in the EU, EFTA, or UK from 1 January 2023 unless it is updated to comply with Euro 5. New sales are already banned in India as it does not comply with BS VI.

Notes

GSX-S750
Standard motorcycles